Jan Gałązka (4 January 1945 – 7 January 1982) was a Polish boxer. He competed in the men's bantamweight event at the 1968 Summer Olympics. At the 1968 Summer Olympics, he lost to Roberto Cervantes of Mexico.

References

1945 births
1982 deaths
Polish male boxers
Olympic boxers of Poland
Boxers at the 1968 Summer Olympics
Sportspeople from Białystok
Bantamweight boxers
20th-century Polish people